Dino Sean Babers (born July 19, 1961) is an American football coach who is the current head football coach at Syracuse University. He was head coach at Bowling Green State University from 2014 to 2015. Prior to that, Babers had been head coach at Eastern Illinois University. Babers grew up in California and played football at the University of Hawaiʻi at Mānoa.

Playing career
Babers was born in Honolulu, grew up in San Diego, and attended the University of Hawaii at Manoa (1979–1983) where he played running back and defensive back on the football team.

Coaching career
Babers began his coaching career as a graduate assistant at Hawaii in 1984. From there, Babers coached at numerous schools highlighted by offensive coordinator positions at both Arizona and Texas A&M as well as an assistant head coach position with UCLA. After four years as an assistant at Baylor, on December 9, 2011, Babers was named as the new head football coach at Eastern Illinois University to replace Bob Spoo. In two seasons at Eastern Illinois, the Panthers made the playoffs both times, led by quarterback Jimmy Garoppolo, who was a second-round pick in the 2014 NFL Draft.

On December 18, 2013, Babers was hired as the new head coach at Bowling Green following the departure of previous Falcons' coach Dave Clawson to Wake Forest.  Babers led Bowling Green to the 2015 Mid-American Conference (MAC) championship.

On December 5, 2015, Babers became the head coach at Syracuse.

After a 10-win season in 2018, Babers received a contract extension through the 2023 season.

Head coaching record

* Babers resigned before bowl game

References

External links
 Syracuse profile

1961 births
Living people
American football defensive backs
American football running backs
Arizona State Sun Devils football coaches
Arizona Wildcats football coaches
Baylor Bears football coaches
Bowling Green Falcons football coaches
Eastern Illinois Panthers football coaches
Hawaii Rainbow Warriors football coaches
Hawaii Rainbow Warriors football players
Northern Arizona Lumberjacks football coaches
Pittsburgh Panthers football coaches
Purdue Boilermakers football coaches
San Diego State Aztecs football coaches
Syracuse Orange football coaches
Texas A&M Aggies football coaches
UNLV Rebels football coaches
UCLA Bruins football coaches
Players of American football from San Diego
Players of American football from Honolulu
African-American coaches of American football
African-American players of American football
21st-century African-American people
20th-century African-American sportspeople